Tazareh or Tazereh, also rendered as Tarzeh, may refer to:
 Tazareh, Isfahan (تزره - Tazareh)
 Torzeh (ترزه - Torzeh or Tarzeh), Isfahan Province
 Tazarah (تزره - Tazarah), Lorestan Province
 Tazareh, Semnan (طزره - Ţazareh)